Alexandra Larochelle (born 1993) is Canadian writer. In 2004, at the age of ten, she published her first novel, Beyond the Universe, which she had written the year before. It was the first work and she has published five other novels in this series.

Larochelle was among the guests of honor at the 2005 Quebec International Book Fair, the 2005 edition of the Montreal Book Fair, and the 2008 edition of the Rimouski Book Fair. In January 2006, Christal Films announced that Larochelle's first three novels would be made into films. Larochelle participates in the show Le Livre Show in Vox. She collaborates with Cool magazines!, and Between the lines.

In 2015, she published the novel Des papillons pis de la gravity at Libre Expression. The second volume of the series was released at the beginning of October 2016 under the English title of: Butterflies and the Big Cinema.

Works
    Trucs de peur T.1 : Perdues dans le noir, Les Éditions de la Bagnole (2019)
    Trucs de peur T.2 : Un fantôme trop bavard, Les Éditions de la Bagnole (2019)
    Trucs de peur T.3 : Le mystère de la sorcière, Les Éditions de la Bagnole (2020)
    Trucs de peur T.4 : Le lac des marins disparus, Les Éditions de la Bagnole (2021)
    Trucs de peur T.5 : Le train de l'horreur, Les Éditions de la Bagnole (2021)
    Premier rendez-vous T.1 : Le pire meilleur ami, Éditions Michel Quintin (2020)
    Premier rendez-vous T.2 : L'amour, c'est du caca, Éditions Michel Quintin  (2020)
    Premier rendez-vous T.3 : Seuls au monde, Éditions Michel Quintin  (2021)
    Premier rendez-vous T.4 : Toast à l'amour perdu, Éditions Michel Quintin  (2021)
    Val-Caduc: La ville des morts, Glénat Québec (2020)
    Troisième étoile T.1 : De L.A. à Laval, Les Éditions de la Bagnole (2018)
    Troisième étoile T.2 : La revanche d'une fille trahie, Les Éditions de la Bagnole (2019)
    Troisième étoile T.3 : Le grand pardon?, Les Éditions de la Bagnole (2019)
   Des papillons pis de la gravité, Libre Expression (2015)
    Des papillons pis du grand cinéma (2016)
    Des papillons pis des fins du monde (2018)
    Au-delà de l'univers Éditions du Trécarré (2004)
    Mission périlleuse en Erianigami Éditions du Trécarré (Au-delà de l'univers - tome 2) (2004)
    La Clé de l'énigme (Au-delà de l'univers - tome 3) Éditions du Trécarré (2005)
    Quiproquo et sorcellerie (Au-delà de l'univers - tome 4) Éditions du Trécarré (2006)
    Épreuve infernale (Au-delà de l'univers - tome 5) Éditions du Trécarré (2006)
    Lorafil - L'avenir à l'agonie (Au-delà de l'univers - tome 6) Éditions du Trécarré (2007)

References

External links

1993 births
Living people
People from Laval, Quebec
Writers from Quebec
21st-century Canadian women writers
Université Laval alumni